This is the list of home video releases of American comedy drama and mystery television series Desperate Housewives. Desperate Housewives has been released for home video by Walt Disney Studios Home Entertainment.

Season 1

Region 1

Region 2

Region 3

Region 4

Region 5

Special features 
 Audio Commentary by series creator, Marc Cherry on the following episodes:
 "Pilot"
 "Anything You Can Do" 
 "Guilty"
 "Impossible" 
 "One Wonderful Day" 
 Audio Commentary on the Housewives''' favorite scenes with:
 Teri Hatcher on "Pretty Little Picture", "Move On" and "Impossible"
 Felicity Huffman on "Guilty" and "Sunday in the Park with George"
 Marcia Cross on "Running to Stand Still" and "Come Back to Me"
 Eva Longoria on "Pilot" and "Ah, But Underneath"
 Nicollette Sheridan on "Anything You Can Do" and "The Ladies Who Lunch"
 Featurettes
 Desperate Housewives: Around the World
 Multi-Language Scene: Bree's dinner party scene in "Pretty Little Picture"
 "Oprah Winfrey Is the New Neighbor" clip from The Oprah Winfrey Show.
 Dressing Wisteria Lane: Costumes and Set Designs
 Gabrielle's Fashion Show
 Secrets of Wisteria Lane with Marc Cherry, Meredith Vieira and the writers of Desperate Housewives A Stroll Down Wisteria Lane with Marc Cherry and Meredith Vieira
 Behind the scenes of Desperate Housewives hosted by Meredith Vieira
 Outtakes and Bloopers from the Set
 Deleted scenes cut from certain episodes with optional commentary by Marc Cherry
 Extended versions of "Who's That Woman?", "Anything You Can Do", "Every Day a Little Death", "Impossible", "Sunday in the Park with George" and "Goodbye for Now" with introductions by Marc Cherry.
 Easter Egg (Hidden Bonus Feature)
 On the fourth disc, in the Bonus Feature menu, highlight "Deleted Scenes" and press up. A key hidden in the gray area will suddenly appear. If you press it, you will get a funny little featurette about the controversy surrounding Jesse Metcalf's butt cheeks on episode "Ah, But Underneath".

Notes
  – the DVD-set without bonus features and audio commentaries

 Season 2 

 Region 1 

 Region 2 

 Region 3 

 Region 4 

 Region 5 

 Special features 

 Marc & Mom: Interview with the series' creator and his mother, the muse
 Directing Desperate Housewives: An episode from concept to completion
 Desperate Role Models: Iconic TV housewives share their wit and wisdom with the women of Wisteria Lane
 Cherry-Picked: Creator Marc Cherry's favorite scenes
 Unaired Storylines: Exclusive unseen Susan Mayer and Lynette Scavo's storylines
 Deleted Scenes
 Fashion & Couture: Costume designer Cate Adair shows how the housewives' looks are created and how you can get the look too
 Juicy Bites: Housewives of Wisteria Lane reveal their juiciest moments
 "The Whole Story" Promo
 Desperate Housewives Poker: Mini-activity from Desperate Housewives – The Game 

Notes
  – released as a seven-disc boxset instead of six since each disc contains four episodes instead of five
  – the boxsets split so that the first part could be released right after these episodes had been shown on television; each part contains four discs
  – released as a six-disc boxset without bonus features

 Season 3 

 Region 1 

 Region 2 

 Region 3 

 Region 4 

 Region 5 

 Special features 
 The Housewives Go Latin: Amas de Casa Desesperadas Featurette on the Weddings in Season 3 
 On Set with Eva
 Cherry-Picked: Marc Cherry's favorite scenes
 Deleted Scenes
 Outtakes
 Bloopers
 A special limited edition of the DVD set sold exclusively in Best Buy stores featured the seventh disc with a 15-minute featurette about the villains of Desperate Housewives in the third season. It also served as a behind-the-scenes look at the third season's mystery.

 Season 4 

 Region 1 

 Region 2 

 Region 3 

 Region 4 

 Special features 
 Getting Desperate from Beginning to End: A behind-the-scenes look at the "Tornado" episode 
 Couples Commentary
 The Men of Wisteria Lane Reveal Their Own Secrets
 Deleted Scenes
 Bloopers
 Cherry-Picked: Marc Cherry's favorite scenes
 Alternative ending to the fourth season's finale

 Season 5 

 Region 1 

 Region 2 

 Region 3 

 Region 4 

 Special features 
 Bloopers
 Deleted Scenes
 Cherry-Picked: Creator Marc Cherry's favorite scenes
 "What More Do I Need?" – A Very Good Read: A behind-the-scenes look at how the process unfolds from script to screen
 I Know Things Now: Desperate Housewives Celebrates 100: A lookback at 100 episodes of comedy
 So Very Teri
 A Best Buy exclusive seven-disc set was also released on the same date as the regular set; it was also released in Australia as a JB Hi-fi exclusive featuring the following 20-minute long extras:
 Wisteria Lane's Mystery Club 
 On Set with Lily Tomlin & Kathryn Joosten
 Exclusive Deleted Scenes

 Season 6 

 Region 1 

Region 2

 Region 3 

 Region 4 

 Special features 
 Desperate for Trivia – Five-minute featurette in which the actors get asked questions from earlier seasons
 Growing Up on Wisteria Lane – Featurette about the kids and their experience on the series
 Deleted Scenes
 Bloopers

 Season 8 

 Region 1 

Region 2

 Region 3 

 Region 4 

 Special features 
 Extended Series Finale
 Cherry Cam – Marc Cherry makes a cameo
 The End of the Lane: The Last Days on the Set
 Behind the Camera
 Deleted Scenes
 Bloopers
 Audio Commentary with Marc Cherry

 The Complete Collection 

 Region 1 

Region 2

 Region 3 

 Region 4 

 Special features 

 Dinner for Five with the Housewives: Food, Drink and Fun!
 Roasting Desperate Housewives A Trip Down Wisteria Lane
 Desperately Dead
 Wisteria at 8: A Look at the Past 8 Years
 And more!

 Official studio description Inside this exquisitely appointed box, a treasure trove of guilty pleasure awaits. Delve inside and bite into the forbidden fruit that has seduced and satisfied audiences for almost a decade: ABC'S DESPERATE HOUSEWIVES: THE COMPLETE COLLECTION. This special collector's set is a must-own indulgence for true fans of the iconic series and includes all eight juicy seasons. That's nearly 7,700 minutes on 45 discs—plus an additional disc full of exclusive bonus features. Experience the sexy, scintillating series that blew the lid off suburbia and exposed a world of sin and secrets hidden behind the façade of manicured lawns and pampered lives. Revisit the ladies of Wisteria Lane and relive every delicious, decadent moment with the collection that's completely "Desperate" and utterly divine!''

Pricing 
 United States: US$149.99 SRP
 Canada: C$179.99 SRP
 United Kingdom: £100.00
 Australia: A$195
 Germany: €129.00
 France : €149,99
 Turkey: ₺599,00

References

DVD